Eco Shooter: Plant 530, known as 530 Eco Shooter in Japan and Europe, is a game developed by Intelligent Systems and published by Nintendo for the Wii's WiiWare service. It was first released in Japan on November 24, 2009, and later released in North America on December 21, 2009 and in Europe on January 29, 2010.

References

2009 video games
Nintendo games
Shooter video games
Video games developed in Japan
Wii-only games
Wii games
WiiWare games
Multiplayer and single-player video games